Penik may refer to:
Artin Penik (1921-1982), Turkish protester
Penik, Iran, a village in Khuzestan Province, Iran